S/PDIF (Sony/Philips Digital Interface) is a type of digital audio interface used in consumer audio equipment to output audio over relatively short distances. The signal is transmitted over either a coaxial cable (using RCA or BNC connectors) or a fiber optic cable with TOSLINK connectors. S/PDIF interconnects components in home theaters and other digital high-fidelity systems.

S/PDIF is based on the AES3 interconnect standard. S/PDIF can carry two channels of uncompressed PCM audio or compressed 5.1 surround sound (such as DTS audio codec or Dolby Digital codec); it cannot support lossless surround formats that require greater bandwidth.

S/PDIF is a data link layer protocol as well as a set of physical layer specifications for carrying digital audio signals over either optical or electrical cable. The name stands for Sony/Philips Digital Interconnect Format but is also known as Sony/Philips Digital Interface. Sony and Philips were the primary designers of S/PDIF. S/PDIF is standardized in IEC 60958 as IEC 60958 type II (IEC 958 before 1998).

Applications
A common use is to carry two channels of uncompressed digital audio from a CD player to an amplifying receiver.

The S/PDIF interface is also used to carry compressed digital audio for surround sound as defined by the IEC 61937 standard. This mode is used to connect the output of a Blu-ray, DVD player or computer, via optical or coax, to a home theatre amplifying receiver that supports Dolby Digital or DTS decoding.

Hardware specifications

S/PDIF was developed at the same time as the main standard, AES3, used to interconnect professional audio equipment in the professional audio field. This resulted from the desire of the various stakeholders to have at least sufficient similarities between the two interfaces to allow the use of the same, or very similar, designs for interfacing ICs. S/PDIF is nearly identical at the protocol level, but uses either coaxial cable (with RCA connectors) or optical fibre (TOSLINK; i.e., F05 or EIAJ optical), both of which cost less than the XLR connection used by AES3. The RCA connectors are typically colour-coded orange to differentiate from other RCA connector uses such as composite video. S/PDIF uses 75 Ω coaxial cable while AES3 uses 110 Ω balanced twisted pair.

Signals transmitted over consumer-grade TOSLINK connections are identical in content to those transmitted over coaxial connectors, though TOSLINK S/PDIF commonly exhibits higher jitter.

Protocol specifications

S/PDIF is used to transmit digital signals in a number of formats, the most common being the 48 kHz sample rate format (used in Digital Audio Tape) and the 44.1 kHz format, used in CD audio. In order to support both systems, as well as others that might be needed, the format has no defined bit rate. Instead, the data is sent using biphase mark code, which has either one or two transitions for every bit, allowing the original word clock to be extracted from the signal itself.

S/PDIF is meant to be used for transmitting 20-bit audio data streams plus other related information. To transmit sources with less than 20 bits of sample accuracy, the superfluous bits will be set to zero. S/PDIF can also transport 24-bit samples by way of four extra bits; however, not all equipment supports this, and these extra bits may be ignored.

S/PDIF protocol differs from AES3 only in the channel status bits. Both protocols group 192 samples into an audio block, and transmit one channel status bit per sample, providing one 192-bit channel status word per channel per audio block. For S/PDIF, the 192-bit status word is identical between the two channels and is divided into 12 words of 16 bits each, with the first 16 bits being a control code.

Limitations
The receiver does not control the data rate, so it must avoid bit slip by synchronizing its reception with the source clock. Many S/PDIF implementations cannot fully decouple the final signal from influence of the source or the interconnect. Specifically, the process of clock recovery used to synchronize reception may produce jitter. If the DAC does not have a stable clock reference then noise will be introduced into the resulting analog signal. However, receivers can implement various strategies that limit this influence.

See also
 ADAT Lightpipe
 I²S
 McASP

Notes

References

External links 

S/PDIF at Epanorama.net

More about channel data bits
Interfacing AES3 and S/PDIF

Computer hardware standards
IEC 60958
Digital audio transport
Digital audio connectors